This article is a List of modern Sufi scholars. The Sufis in the list were known in the 20th century or later. They are grouped geographically.

Arabian Peninsula
Abdallah Bin Bayyah (born 1935) – Saudi Arabia
Habib Ali al-Jifri (born 1971) – Yemen
Habib Umar bin Hafiz (born 1962) – Yemen
Muhammad Alawi al-Maliki (1944–2004) – Saudi Arabia

Levant
Abd al-Rahman al-Shaghouri (1912–2004) – Syria
Mohamed Said Ramadan Al-Bouti (1929–2013) – Syria
Muhammad al-Yaqoubi (born 1963) – Syria
Nuh Ha Mim Keller (born 1954) – Jordan
Wahba Zuhayli (1932–2015) – Syria
Yusuf an-Nabhani (1849–1932) – Palestine

North Africa
Abd al-Aziz al-Ghumari (1920–1997) – Morocco
Abd al-Hamid Kishk (1933–1996) – Egypt
Abdul Baqi Miftah (born 1952) – Algeria
Ahmad al-Alawi (1869–1934) – Algeria
Ahmed el-Tayeb (born 1946) – Egypt
Ali Gomaa (born 1951) – Egypt
Lalla Zaynab (1850-1904) - Algeria
Hamza al Qadiri al Boutchichi (born 1922) – Morocco
Hamza Yusuf (born 1960) – United States
Muhammad ibn al-Habib (1876–1972) – Morocco
Muhammad Sayyid Tantawy (1928–2010) – Egypt
Shawki Allam (born 1961) – Egypt

West, Central and Southern Africa
Abdalqadir as-Sufi (1930–2021) – South Africa
Abdullah al-Harari (1910–2008) – Ethiopia
Ahmad Tijani Ali Cisse (born 1955) – Senegal
Amadou Bamba (1853–1927) – Senegal
Hassan Cissé (1945–2008) – Senegal
Sa'adu Abubakar (born 1954) – Nigeria
Sanusi Lamido Sanusi (born 1961) – Nigeria
Osman Nuhu Sharubutu (born 1919) - Ghana

Western Europe
Abdal Hakim Murad (born 1960) – United Kingdom
Ahmed Saad Al-Azhari (born 1978) – United Kingdom
Frithjof Schuon (1907–1998) – Switzerland
Idries Shah (1924–1996) – United Kingdom
Llewellyn Vaughan-Lee (born 1953) – United Kingdom
Martin Lings (1909–2005) – United Kingdom
Muhammad Imdad Hussain Pirzada (born 1946) – United Kingdom
Annemarie Schimmel (1922–2003) – Germany
Ivan Aguéli (1969–1917) – Sweden
Umar Al-Qadri – Ireland

Eastern Europe
 Said Afandi al-Chirkawi (1937–2012) – Dagestan
 Ahmet Mahmut Ünlü (born 1965) – Turkey
 Hüseyin Hilmi Işık (1911-2001) – Turkey
 Mahmud Esad Coşan (1938–2001) – Turkey
 Mahmut Ustaosmanoğlu (1929-2022) – Turkey
 Mehmed Fatih Çıtlak (born 1967) – Turkey
 Muzaffer Ozak (1916–1985) – Turkey
 Nazim Al-Haqqani (1922–2014) – Turkey
 Osman Nuri Topbaş (born 1942) – Turkey
 Ömer Tuğrul İnançer (1946-2022) - Turkey
 Said Nursî (1878–1960) – Turkey
 Süleyman Ateş (born 1933) – Turkey

North America
Ali Kianfar (born 1944) – United States
Ahmed Tijani Ben Omar (born 1950) – United States
Faraz Rabbani (born 1974) – Canada
Feisal Abdul Rauf (born 1948) – United States
Hamza Yusuf (born 1960) – United States
Hisham Kabbani (born 1945) – United States
Hossein Nasr (born 1933) – United States
M. A. Muqtedar Khan (born 1966) – United States
Muhammad bin Yahya al-Ninowy (born 1966) – United States
Nahid Angha (born 1945) – United States
Nooruddeen Durkee (born 1938) – United States
Robert Darr (born 1951) – United States 
Syed Soharwardy (born 1955) – Canada
Zaid Shakir (born 1956) – United States

South Asia
Mohammad Abu Bakr Siddique – West Bengal
Wasif Ali Wasif (1929–1993) – Pakistan
Abdul Rashid Dawoodi (1979)_founder of (Tehreek-e-Soutul Auwliya)_India
Bawa Muhaiyaddeen (?–1986) – Sri Lanka
Ahmed Ullah Maizbhanderi (1826–1906) – Bangladesh
Azangachhi Shaheb (1828/1829–1932) – India
Imdadullah Muhajir Makki (1817–1899) – India
Meher Ali Shah (1859–1937) – Pakistan
Mohammad Abdul Ghafoor Hazarvi (1909–1970) – Pakistan
Muhammad Akram Awan (1934-2017) – Pakistan
Pir Muhammad Alauddin Siddiqui (1936-2017) of Nerian Sharif Azad Kashmir-Pakistan
Muhammad Tahir-ul-Qadri (born 1951) – Pakistan
Qalandar Baba Auliya (1898–1979) – Pakistan
Qamaruzzaman Azmi (born 1946) – India
Saheb Qiblah Fultali (1913–2008) – Bangladesh
Shah Shahidullah Faridi (1915–1978) – Pakistan
Syed Muhammad Zauqi Shah (1878–1951) – Pakistan
Syed Waheed Ashraf (born 1933) – India
Tajuddin Muhammad Badruddin (1861–1925) – India
Ahmad Raza Khan Barelvi (1856 - 1921)
Thaika Shuaib (1930–2021) – India
Wahid Baksh Sial Rabbani (died 1995) – Pakistan
Waris Ali Shah (1819–1905) – India
Shah Syed Hasnain Baqai - India
Sayyad Muhammad Ashraf Kichhouchhwi - India
Sayyad Muhammad Izhar Ashraf - India
Hujjat-ul-Islam Hamid Raza Khan (1875–1943) – India
Kareemullah Shah (1838–1913) – India
Masihullah Khan
Mustafa Raza Khan (1892–1981) – India
Machiliwale Shah (died 1932) – India
Syed Mohammed Mukhtar Ashraf- India

Eastern and Central Asia
Habib Ali Kwitang (1870–1968) – Indonesia
Habib Munzir Al-Musawa (1973–2013) – Indonesia
Habib Usman bin Yahya (1822–1913) – Indonesia
Muhammad Abdul Aleem Siddiqi (1892–1954) – Singapore
Muhammad Ma Jian (1906–1978) – China
Syed Muhammad Naquib al-Attas (born 1931) – Malaysia

Oceania 
 Halim Rane - Australia

References

External links
 Professor Mohamad Abdalla- Australia

 Modern
 Sufi Modern
Sufi scholars, Modern
Sufi scholars, Modern
Sufi scholars, Modern
Scholars Modern
.Sufi Modern
.Sufi Modern